Gentleman Jim may refer to:

Nickname
Jim Brough (1903-1986), English rugby union, and rugby league footballer, and coach
Jim Cleary (Australian footballer) (1914-1993), Australian rules footballer
James J. Corbett (1866-1933), American world heavyweight boxing champion
Jimmy Dickinson (1925-1982), English footballer
Jim Fanning (1927-2015), American-Canadian Major League Baseball player, manager and executive
Jim Kramer (born 1958), champion Scrabble player
Jim Langley (1929-2007), English footballer
Jimmy Lewthwaite (1920-2006), English rugby union, and rugby league footballer
Jim Leytham (1879-1916), English rugby league footballer
Jim Lonborg (born 1942), American retired Major League Baseball pitcher
Jim Manson (Australian footballer) (died 2010), Australian rules footballer and politician
Jim McKeever (born 1930), Irish former Gaelic footballer
Jim Reeves (1923–1964), American country and popular music singer
Gentleman Jim Robinson (1799-1875), African-American entrepreneur
Jim Snyder (coach) (1919-1994), American college basketball head coach
Jim Thome (born 1970), American retired Major League Baseball player
James K. Woolnough (1910-1996), U.S. Army general
James J. Yeager, American college football player and head coach

Other uses
Gentleman Jim (film), a 1942 film starring Errol Flynn as the boxer James J. Corbett
Gentleman Jim, an 1878 publication of Elizabeth Prentiss
Gentleman Jim, a 1980 book by children's author Raymond Briggs
"Gentleman Jim", an episode of the animated children's show Tracey McBean
 Ch. Gentleman Jim, one of the first champion Staffordshire Bull Terriers

Lists of people by nickname